Mount Cristal is a mountain located in the Cristal Mountains, in Minas Gerais in Brazil, on the border between the municipalities of Santo Antônio do Rio Abaixo and Conceição do Mato Dentro

Cristal
Landforms of Minas Gerais